Gyula Kornis (originally Kremer Gyula; 22 December 1885 – 17 April 1958) was a Hungarian Piarist, philosopher, educator, professor and politician, who served as Speaker of the House of Representatives for a short time in 1938.

He had an important role in implementation of educational policy of Count Kuno von Klebelsberg, Minister of Religion and Education in the cabinet of István Bethlen in the 1920s. Kornis also served as interim President of the Hungarian Academy of Sciences in 1945, after the Second World War.

In the 1933/34 academic year, he was the Dean of the Faculty of Humanities of the Eötvös Loránd University.

Works
 Education in Hungary, New York, 1932
 Hungary and European Civilisation, Budapest, 1938

Sources
 Bimbó Mihály: Kornis Gyula Történetfilozófiá-ja – Kossuth Lajos Tudományegyetem, Debrecen, 1999, 94 o. – 
 Demeter Katalin: Széljegyzetek Kornis Gyula Nietzsche és Petőfi című írásához – Kultúra, műveltség, oktatás Kornis Gyula nézőpontjából – In: Filozófia–Művelődés–Történet 2007 – Az Eötvös Lóránd Tudományegyetem Tanító- és Óvóképző Főiskolai Karának Tudományos Közleményei XXIX. – Trezor Kiadó, Budapest, 2007, 191–210. o. – ISSN 0139-4991 – Hozzáférés ideje: 2011. január 5. 22:00.
 Hanák Tibor: Kornis Gyula – In: Az elfelejtett reneszánsz – A magyar filozófiai gondolkodás a század első felében – Göncöl Kiadó, Budapest, 1993, 97–100. o.  – 
 Kováts Gyuláné: Kultúra és politika Kornis Gyula közoktatáspolitikai tevékenységében – Hazafias Népfront Győr-Sopron Megyei Bizottsága, Győr, 1989, 147 o. – 
 Kovátsné Németh Mária: Kornis Gyula kultúrelméleti felfogása – Magyar Pedagógia, 1995, 1–2. sz. 77–87. o. – Hozzáférés ideje: 2011. január 5. 22:00.
 Mészáros István: Egy sztoikus bölcs – kitelepítve. Kornis Gyula 1951–1957 közötti leveleiből – Szabadelvű Unió, 1990, 41–49. o. (különszám)
 Nagy József: Kornis Gyula mint kultúrpolitikus – Minerva, Budapest, 1928, 8. sz. 19 o.
 Perecz László: A pozitivizmustól a szellemtörténetig, – Horror Metaphysicae, – Osiris Kiadó, Budapest, 1998,  244 o. – 
 Somos Róbert: Filozófia és politika Kornis Gyula munkásságában – Valóság, XLVI. évf., 2003, 2. sz. 63–78. o. – Hozzáférés ideje: 2011. január 5. 22:00
  Szabolcs Éva: Értékelmélet és kultúrfilozófia a Magyar Paedagogia című folyóiratban – Kornis Gyula és Prohászka Lajos – In. A szellemtudományi pedagógia magyar recepciója – Szerk.: Németh András – Gondolat Kiadó, Budapest, 2004, 145–160. o. – 
 Tar Károly: Kornis Gyula nevelésfilozófiájának főbb sajátosságai – Tankönyvkiadó, Budapest, 1964, 5–15. o. (Klny.)

1885 births
1958 deaths
Speakers of the House of Representatives of Hungary
Members of the Hungarian Academy of Sciences
20th-century Hungarian philosophers